, commonly abbreviated as Pop'n, PM or PNM and stylized as pop'n music, is a music video game series in the Bemani series made by Konami. The games are known for their bright colors, upbeat songs, and cute cartoon character graphics. Originally released in 1998, the series has had 22 home releases in Japan as well as 30 mainline arcade versions.

Gameplay

Unlike most of Konami's Bemani series, the Pop'n Music interface is not designed to represent any actual musical instrument. Instead, it uses nine buttons, each three-and-a-half-inches in diameter, laid out in two rows (Since the location test of Wonderland, a multitouch panel is added). Five buttons are the bottom row, the other four being the top. Like in most Bemani games, color-coded notes (in this game called "Pop-kun" (ポップ君) and anthropomorphized with faces) fall from the top of the screen in nine columns that correspond to the buttons. When a note reaches the red line at the bottom of the screen, the player presses the button or tap the panel, which triggers a sound within the song.

When a note is played, an accuracy rating is displayed, either "Great", "Good", or "Bad". The maximum number of points possible in any single-stage song is 100,000, and unlike beatmania or beatmania IIDX, can not be exceeded as no additional score bonuses are given. A "Combo" tally is kept of properly played notes like in other Bemani games, but always excludes the first note played; for example, if a song has 322 notes, the maximum combo will be 321. Until Pop'n Music 6, "Good" notes would interrupt a player's combo.

Each song is represented by a character, and players are represented by characters too. The player can choose a character by pressing both yellow buttons on the mode selection screen, but as of Pop'n Music 19 TUNE STREET, the character selection screen automatically pops up after choosing a mode. The default player characters are anthropomorphic rabbit Mimi and anthropomorphic cat Nyami.

In all modes from Pop'n Music 6 and onward, after a song is selected, a splash screen that is displayed showing the character, banner, and BPM of the song. When the player presses both yellow buttons at this screen, an options menu is displayed, where the player can edit the following gameplay options:
Hi-Speed: This option allows player to change the scrolling speed of the notes.
Pop-kun: This option changes the appearance of the notes that appear on the screen.
Appearance: The options here affect the visibility of the notes on the screen.
Random: These options affect how the patterns of notes are processed.

Like other Bemani series games, the Pop'n Music games have a "Groove Gauge" that shows the player's performance. Continually playing the notes in the song properly will cause the Groove Gauge to rise. The goal of the player is to finish the song with the Groove Gauge in the "clear zone", a red portion that represents the top quarter of the bar. When the gauge is at its maximum, "Great" notes become "Fever"- this is purely aesthetic, providing no bonus to score, and usually causes the player's chosen character to perform a different animation. If a player ends a song while in Fever mode, the character's win animation is also often different.

Modes

Battle Mode
Two players compete against each other on the same cabinet or controller using only three buttons (Green, Yellow, and White) to play the same note chart, and a fourth "action" button (Blue). As a player scores "Great" ratings on notes, a power meter increases near the bottom of the screen, and once it reaches a certain level, the player can press the action button. Doing so starts a minigame along the bottom of the screen, requiring the players to alternate pressing the action button in time with the song, in addition to playing the note chart. When one of the players misses, an Ojama is inflicted on them.

Expert Mode
Introduced in Pop'n Music 6 is Expert Mode (or Expert Courses), similar to Nonstop Mode in other Bemani series. The player selects from a pre-made course of four songs and plays through the selected course with a "Stamina" life bar that does not recover. In this mode, another accuracy score is added, "Cool". This makes songs played in these modes significantly more difficult to achieve high scores on, as the value of "Great" and "Good" are decreased. In this mode, "Great" does not become Fever, and instead "Cool" flashes in a similar manner to how "Fever" is displayed in other modes. Expert Mode was removed after Pop'n Music 18 Sengoku Retsuden, but returned in Pop'n Music Lapistoria.

Challenge and Cho-Challenge Modes
Introduced in Pop'n Music 5, Challenge Mode (CHALLENGE モード) is a mode where players are not only scored on their individual songs, but are also given a Challenge Score. Each song is assigned a point value on a scale from 1 to 50 (formerly 1 to 43) regarding to the difficulty, and at the end of a game in one of these modes, the total is tallied. Additionally in these modes, options called "Norma" and "Ojama" may be used to add point values to the player's Challenge Score. A "Norma" is a set goal, while an "Ojama" is an active means of periodically distracting or disrupting the player. Up to two options can be activated at once. On specific numbers, a player may be allowed an "EXtra Stage", an additional stage in which the most difficult charts (EXTRA or "EX" charts) for certain songs may be played and unlocked. EXtra stages use a different gauge than usual, a "Stamina" gauge similar to the life bar in a fighting game, or Dance Dance Revolution's Life Gauge, where complete depletion means the end of the song. It was renamed "Normal Mode" in Pop'n Music 20 Fantasia.

Cho-Challenge Mode (超CHALLENGE モード, "Super Challenge Mode") is similar to Challenge Mode, except that another accuracy score is added, "Cool". This makes songs played in these modes significantly more difficult to achieve high scores on, as the value of "Great" and "Good" are decreased. Starting from pop'n music portable on console releases and Pop'n Music 20 fantasia on arcade releases, "Cool" is always on, regarding to Challenge Mode and Cho-Challenge Mode are combined into one single mode.

Osusume (オススメ, Lit. "Recommendation")
Introduced in Pop'n Music 9 is Osusume (オススメ, Lit. "Recommendation") Mode, where the player is asked a series of questions, and the game provides an Expert course based on the player's answers. It was removed after Pop'n Music 11. Osusume was reintroduced in Pop'n Music 20: Fantasia as a song category within normal mode, containing a selection of songs the player might like, based on the player's song selection history.

Net Taisen Mode (NET対戦 モード, "Net Battle Mode")
With the introduction of the e-AMUSEMENT system in Japan, pop'n music 12 Iroha is the first game to feature "Net Taisen Mode" (NET対戦 モード, "Net Battle Mode"). This mode allows players to compete over the e-AMUSEMENT network in real time with players on other e-AMUSEMENT-ready cabinets. In Pop'n Music 17 The Movie, a CPU-emulated version of this mode has been added, similar to the "Taisen" mode found on consumer releases.

Enjoy Mode
Starting in pop'n music 12 Iroha, "Normal Mode", the standard mode of play, has been removed, replaced instead by "Enjoy Mode". Enjoy Mode is a simplified mode for beginners with a reduced song list, simple note charts, and a less complex grading system, in which the player begins with 100 points and is docked one for each note they fail to play properly. Enjoy Mode incorporates many of the games licensed tracks, providing most players in Japan a mode in which they know the songs and can more easily become interested in the game. Enjoy Mode was renamed "Easy Mode" in Pop'n Music 20 Fantasia, and removed as a whole in Pop'n Music Sunny Park, to be replaced with a new difficulty for Normal Mode: "Easy".

Design and Difficulty

Unlike most other Bemani games, the games in Pop'n Music do not mimic an instrument in gameplay. The buttons are used to play various instruments throughout any given song. The graphics feature brightly colored and primarily solid shapes, rather than the metallic and textured interfaces of other Bemani games. Players may choose a character to play as. The songs are separated by genres like Reggae, Disco Queen, Spy, or Anime Hero, as well as common Bemani genres of eurobeat and forms of electronica. There are also series of songs with similar elements, like the Classic series (which are medleys of classical music) and the Powerfolk series. Each song has a variety of modes. These include Enjoy Mode (beginner and Easy notes), 5-line Mode (for 5 buttons) and Normal mode (on-beat notes and simple chords). Most songs have a hyper mode (with more notes and harder chords), and some songs have an EXtra mode (with lots of notes and complicated chords). Pop'n Music has no other visuals except for the character the player chose, an opponent character, and the scrolling notes. The characters are animated, and act differently based on the player's performance.

Pop'n Music games can be challenging at high difficulty levels. The higher difficulty levels are considered by some players to be the most challenging of any music game. However, Pop'n Music also features easier content for beginners. In this way, Pop'n Music caters to a wide variety of players.

Arcade versions

 pop'n music (September 28, 1998)
 pop'n music 2 (March 19, 1999)
 pop'n music 3 (September 17, 1999)
 pop'n music 4 (March 18, 2000)
 pop'n music 5 (November 17, 2000)
 pop'n music 6 (April 28, 2001)
 pop'n music 7 (November 22, 2001)
 pop'n music 8 (May 30, 2002)
 pop'n music 9 (December 26, 2002)
 pop'n music 10 (August 6, 2003)
 pop'n music 11 (March 24, 2004)
 pop'n music 12 いろは(pop'n music 12 Iroha) (December 8, 2004)
 pop'n music 13 カーニバル(pop'n music 13 Carnival)  (September 7, 2005)
 pop'n music 14 FEVER! (May 17, 2006)

 pop'n music 15 ADVENTURE (April 25, 2007)
 pop'n music 16 PARTY♪ (March 24, 2008)
 pop'n music 17 THE MOVIE (March 4, 2009)
 pop'n music 18 せんごく列伝(pop'n music 18 Sengoku Retsuden) (January 20, 2010)
 pop'n music 19 TUNE STREET (December 9, 2010)
 pop'n music 20 fantasia (December 7, 2011)
 pop'n music Sunny Park (December 5, 2012)
 pop'n music ラピストリア (pop'n music Lapistoria) (June 25, 2014)
 pop'n music éclale (November 26, 2015)
 pop'n music うさぎと猫と少年の夢(pop'n music Usagi to Neko to Shōnen no Yume) (December 14, 2016)
 pop'n music peace (October 17, 2018)
 pop'n music 解明リドルズ(pop'n music Kaimei Riddles) (December 9, 2020)
 pop' music UniLab (September 13, 2022)

Pop'n Music Mickey Tunes (2000)
Pop'n Music Mickey Tunes contains Disney music and Disney characters as opposed to the usual characters and songs made specifically for the Pop'n Music series. The PlayStation port is known as Pop'n Music Disney Tunes.

Pop'n Music Animelo 2 (2001)
Pop'n Music Animelo 2 is the most expensive Pop'n Music version to date, due to its song list consisting completely of anime, as well as television show, licensed songs. This version is also the only one with the infamous "double" and "triple" modes. These options were originally provided with the intention of allowing multiple people to play along by adding one or two more notes for every note in the chart, sometimes resulting in a chord of all nine buttons. However, it became a popular challenge for a single player to play a song in "double" or "triple" mode.

Consumer software

Home versions
The first four console games for the Pop'n Music series were released on the PlayStation and the Dreamcast, with nine buttons on the controller. Two other main games were released exclusively for the PlayStation, while two spin-offs were released for both the PlayStation and the Game Boy Color. These games are as follows:

 Pop'n Music
 Pop'n Music 2
 Pop'n Music 3 Append Disc
 Pop'n Music 4 Append Disc

 Pop'n Music 5
 Pop'n Music 6
 Pop'n Music Animation Melody
 Pop'n Music Disney Tunes

The first two games share 19 songs in common. Pop'n Music 2 also added 27 new songs, for a total of 46, and features Key Disc technology to allow play of Append Disc games. Pop'n Music 3 features a total of 44 songs, split between 22 new songs and 22 returning songs, though eight of these returning songs feature more challenging Hyper charts instead. As an Append Disc, it functions like an expansion pack, requiring a Key Disc to play. Pop'n Music 4 features a total of 41 songs, of which five are returning. This is the final release for Dreamcast. Like its predecessor, it requires a Key Disc.

Pop'n Music 5 was the first game in the main series to be exclusive to PlayStation. It featured 63 songs. Like Pop'n Music 2, it also features Key Disc technology, allowing play of its two predecessors. Pop'n Music 6 featured 104 songs, the largest library available for the original PlayStation and the final game for that system. Like its predecessor and Pop'n Music 2, it also features Key Disc technology.

Future console games for the main series and one compilation, all released from 2002 to 2007, are PlayStation 2 exclusives:

 Pop'n Music 7
 Pop'n Music 8
 Pop'n Music 9
 Pop'n Music 10
 Pop'n Music 11

 Pop'n Music 12 いろは (Iroha)
 Pop'n Music 13 カーニバル (Carnival)
 Pop'n Music 14 FEVER!
 Pop'n Music Best Hits

A revised controller was also released for the PS2 at the same time as Pop'n Music 10, though it is also compatible with the original PlayStation.

Handheld versions
Pop'n Music Anywhere was a mini-game released for the VMU and PocketStation, handheld memory cards for the Dreamcast and PlayStation, respectively. The mini-game can be loaded using Pop'n Music 2 and Pop'n Music 4 for each respective console.

Pop'n Music GB was released on March 30, 2000 for the Game Boy Color. It features 25 songs. Two spin-offs, Pop'n Music Animation Melody and Pop'n Music Disney Tunes, were released in September 2000. All games use five buttons for charts instead of nine.

On February 4, 2010, Pop'n Music Portable was released on PlayStation Portable. It is intended to be the console release for Pop'n Music 15 Adventure, and so the song list and interface are based on that game. A sequel, Pop'n Music Portable 2 was released on November 23, 2011. The game is based on Pop'n Music 16 PARTY, and offers DLC songs available for purchase.

Pop'n Stage
Pop'n Stage is a dancing game based around the Pop'n Music design and songs, with ten "switches" (four diagonals and a center on each side, just like Pump It Up's panel placement). It is a combination of Pop'n Music and Dance Dance Revolution, using Pop'n-style graphics with DDR-style gameplay. The game has a bright, colorful interface and machine design, and is considered easy compared to most other Bemani games. The game is also keysounded, similarly to Pop'n Music, meaning that missing a step will result in corresponding sounds in the song not being played.

Pop'n Stage breaks up gameplay styles in an unconventional way compared to other dance games; the default single player mode uses 6-switches (corresponding to Pump It Up's half double; in other words, 6-switch mode does not use the four outer corners). Meanwhile, 10-switch mode is the default 2-player configuration on "Normal" and "Hard" modes (corresponding to 5-switches per person on each side, similar to Pump It Up's single player mode) and "Maniac" mode being similar to a single-player "double-play" mode.

One upgrade kit was released for this franchise before being cancelled under the name "Pop'n Stage EX". This upgrade fixed a handful of gameplay issues from the first game, added new charts and "Expert mode" stages, and added songs from Pop'n Music 3 (as well as the song "Full Moon" by LITTLE CURE, which has never been used on another Bemani game since). Both versions of the game ran on Konami's "DJ Main" arcade hardware.

Adaptation
 Pop'n Music Wakuwaku! Pop'n Manga

See also
Beat'n Groovy, the Xbox Live Arcade adaptation

References

External links 
Pop'n Music, Konami of Japan's website of the current version
Pop'n World, Konami of Japan's former official Pop'n Music site.
Konami - Pop'n Stage Top
Solid State Squad pop'n division, an American Pop'n Score Tracking Site
Bemanistyle.com, Major North American Bemani Site.

Arcade video games
Bemani games
Konami franchises
1998 video games
Music video games
PlayStation 2 games
Video game franchises introduced in 1998